Sres. Papis is an Argentine telenovela produced and broadcast by the Telefe network. It premiered on January 6, 2014 and ended on November 27 of the same year. It aired Monday through Friday, except Wednesdays, at 11:30 p.m. The series was written by Cecilia Guerty and Pablo Junovich, and directed by Gustavo Luppi, Omar Aiello and Pablo Vásquez. It starred Luciano Castro, Joaquín Furriel, Luciano Cáceres and Peto Menahem.

Plot
The story tells the experiences of four modern parents Favio Carbonetti (Luciano Castro), Ignacio Moreno (Joaquín Furriel), Franco Bertossi (Luciano Cáceres) and Mauro de Leone (Peto Menahem) and attractions that make friends by sharing daily talks at the door of your children's kindergarten. In addition to accompanying each other in conflicts, vicissitudes, juggling, surprises and abysses that bring you into paternity, you will be involved in the personal stories of each of them. By sharing the door of the Kindergarten daily, being identified in the problems they face as fathers and feeling even in a world mostly populated by mothers, these four men are joining and consolidating a powerful and endearing friendship.

Premise
The main topic of the telenovela is male paternity, as the main characters have different back stories but all raise children with little or no female help. This topic was addressed very few times before in Argentine telenovelas, such as in the old telenovelas Papá corazón and Grande, pa!. Somos familia (2014) and Solamente Vos (2013) are other Argentine telenovelas that also explored male paternity. Actor Luciano Cáceres described the main characters as antiheroes, with several emotional weaknesses.

Production
Actress Julieta Díaz rejected a proposal to work in the telenovela, as she had plans to work in films during 2014. She declined to work in other Argentine fictions, such as Guapas and Viudas e hijos del Rock and Roll, for a similar reason. The production staff proposed that she could appear as a guest star for 25 episodes. She accepted this proposal, and her role in the story will be that of a cumbia singer, with cumbia songs composed especially for the program.

Production will move to neighbouring Brazil to film scenes for the program during the 2014 FIFA World Cup. It is not confirmed if Cáceres will take part in the project, as he also performs in theater plays.

Reception
The program premiered on January 6, 2014. It received 13.9 rating points, prevailing over the telenovelas aired by El Trece.

Cast
 Luciano Castro as Favio “Chori” Carbonetti
 Joaquín Furriel as Ignacio “Nacho” Moreno
 Luciano Cáceres as Franco Bertossi
 Peto Menahem as Mauro de Leone
 Gloria Carrá as Carla de Leone
 Marcela Kloosterboer as Helena Villaverde
 Laura Novoa as Rocío Soler
 Vanesa González as Luján Cisneros
 Luis Luque as Roberto “Roby” Carbonetti
 Patricia Palmer as Nelly Moreno
 Luis Brandoni as Rafael Rodríguez Merlo
 Julieta Díaz as Daiana Crespo
 Martina Gusmán as Karina Crespo
 Juan Pedro Lanzani as Martín Frenkel
 Elías Viñoles as Román Villaverde
 Silvina Luna as Sabrina Menéndez
 María Abadi as Emma Valente
 Tupac Larriera as Luca Carbonetti
 Martina Campos as Nina de Leone
 Eugenia Alonso  as María Inés García Sastre
 Ignacio Toselli as Luis Miguel “Carucha” Fornari
 Agustín Bello as Pedro Carbonetti
 Uma Salduende as Vera Carbonetti
 Naomi Kogan as Julia Bertossi
 Justina Ceballos as Julia Teen
 Manuel Cumelen Marcer as Thiago de Leone
 Marco Bertelli as Yónatan “Yoni” Crespo
 Olivia Gutiérrez as Morena Bertossi
 Georgina Frescó as Morena Teen
 Marcela Guerty as Giselle Pastor
 Mario Alarcón as Hilario de Leone
 Benjamín Amadeo as José Pablo Arregui
 Diego Alonso Gómez as Ezequiel Torres
 Mercedes Oviedo as Sofía Rodríguez Merlo
 Emilio Bardi as Elías Ibáñez
 Guillermo Marcos as Herrero Sánchez
 Sandra Criolani as Trinidad “Trini Bertossi
 Edgardo Moreira as Dardo Páez Vila
 Giselle Motta as Abril Páez Vila
 Sheila González as Susana Carson
 Belén Persello as Jessica Venturini
 Diego Márquez as Javier Griesa
 Gabriel Villalba as Lenny Castro
 Rodrigo Gosende as Luis Venturini
 Nicolás Fiore as Danilo Rodríguez Merlo
 Mónica Scapparone as Anyelina Yoli
 Mónica Antonópulos as Mariana Negri
 Marco Antonio Caponi as Julián
 Lito Cruz as Dios
 Julieta Cardinali as Magdalena
 Noelia Marzol as Daniela
 Luis Gianneo as Edgar
 Gustavo Conti as Bernardo
 Leonardo Astrada as Himself
 Diego Gentile as Benicio
 Fabián Arenillas as Mosca
 Sabrina Carballo as Zoé
 Magela Zanotta as Andrea
 Lucrecia Oviedo as Gala
 Rocío Domínguez as Nani
 Fernanda Metilli as Paula
 Agustina Vícoli as Pato
 Diego Leske as Manfrini»
 Lorena Vega as Juana
 Belén Chavanne as Pía
 Jorge Varas as García
 Florencia Tesouro Naty
 Facundo Parolari as Pato
 Selva Lione as Sandra
 Daniel Gallardo as César
 Mario Moscoso as Benavídez
 Valentina Lanuza as Lucía
 Analía Couceyro as Jimena
 Agustín Sullivan as Alejo
 Florencia González as Mecha
 Javier Pedersoli as Osvaldo
 Anita Gutiérrez as Anahí
 Emme as Celeste
 Marcelo Melingo as Ulises
 Federico Barga as Chaki
 Richard Wagener as Catriel
 Sandra Villami as Curinaria
 Natalia Santiago as Flor
 Sol Gaschetto as Fernanda
 Ana Laura Moscatto as Marisa
 Ayelen Dotti as Laura
 Marcelo Xicarts as Dante
 Agostina Fabrizio as Magali
 Hernán Márquez as Father of Magali

References

External links

 Official site 
 

2014 Argentine television series debuts
Telefe telenovelas
Spanish-language telenovelas
2014 Argentine television series endings